Delusions of Grandeur is the fourth studio album by the Norwegian heavy metal band Sahg, released on October 25, 2013, under the Norwegian record label Indie Recordings.

Background 
It's the first concept album of the band, with the delusions of grandeur theme or megalomania.

Kvitrafn, original drummer of the band, collaborated in recording of "Walls Of Delusion". The album is the last with the original guitarist Thomas Tofthagen, who left Sahg in order to concentrate solely on his other band Audrey Horne in 2015.

An animated music video was made for "Slip off the Edge of the Universe", directed by Alexander Lillevik.

On February 12, 2014, Metal Blade Records premiered the song "Firechild" from the album in North America on the music blog lastrit.es, ahead of its official North American release on February 18, 2014.

Musical style 
Delusions of Grandeur marks a turning point towards a more experimental sound and a psychedelic stoner rock genre, radically different from the traditional heavy metal style of the previous three albums of the band.

The lyrics tells the tale of a man who slowly loses grasp of everything he has learned and experienced throughout his life and enters a vast imaginary state where he experiences increasingly severe delusions of grandeur.

Cover art 
The cover art (created by illustrator Robert Høyem) presents an imaginary astronaut on a psychedelic colorful background  and geometric shapes. In this regard, Olav Iversen said in an interview:

Track listing

Personnel

Sahg 
Olav Iversen -	Vocals, guitars
Tony Vetaas - Bass, vocals
Thomas Tofthagen - Guitars
Thomas Lønnheim - Drums, percussion

Guest/session musicians 
Einar "Kvitrafn" Selvik - Percussion, vocals (Track 4)
Iver Sandøy - Vocals (additional), percussion, piano, moog, analog soundscapes

Production and engineering 
Iver Sandøy - Producer, mixing, mastering
Robert Høyem - Design
Jarle Hovda Moe - Photography
Norway, Germany, Austria and Sweden release date: October 25, 2013.
Rest of the world: October 28, 2013.

References

External links 
Discogs.com
 Metallum Archvies

2013 albums
Sahg albums
Indie Recordings albums